Alisa Pauliina Vainio (born 16 November 1997) is a Finnish long-distance runner. She won bronze at the 2015 European Athletics Junior Championships in 3,000m steeplechase. She has two Finnish championships from 10,000m (2015 and 2018) and one from the marathon (2018). Vainio also has two world championship bronze-medals from Bandy (Irkutsk 2012 and Lappeenranta 2014).

References

External links
 
 

1997 births
Living people
Finnish female marathon runners
Finnish female long-distance runners
People from Lappeenranta
Sportspeople from South Karelia
20th-century Finnish women
21st-century Finnish women